Sethna is a (Parsi-)Gujarati surname meaning "pertaining to (-na) the ombudsman/broker/administrator/supervisor(seth-)", and may refer to:

 Adi M. Sethna, Indian general
 Beheruz Sethna, academic
 Homi Sethna, chemical engineer
 Kaikhosru Dadhaboy (K. D.) Sethna, poet, philosopher and cultural critic
 Pheroze Sethna, Indian politician